Breaking News Live is a 2013 Malayalam film directed by Sudhir Ambalapadu. The film is produced by Ranjith Kumar and starring Kavya Madhavan and Mythili in the lead roles.

Plot
'Breaking News Live' visualizes the story of Nayana and Sneha. The plot moves forward with the many people who Nayana come across in her life. Nayana realizes the other side of people when she finds their true self. Sneha and her mentally challenged brother are under the care of their grandmother after the death of their parents. When fate makes a chance for Nayana to meet Sneha, Nayana feels that Sneha is a part of her life. The revelation that they are not two but one takes the story to novel planes.

Kavya Madhavan and Mythili do the roles of Nayana and Sneha respectively. Vineeth also does an important role as the trainer of Nayana who is a hotel management student. 
Devan and Urmilla Unni play the characters of Nayana's parents and Sukumari is the grandmother of Sneha. New face Rajeesh acts as Sneha's brother.

Cast
 Kavya Madhavan as Nayana
 Vineeth as Deepak
 Mythili as Sneha
 Mamukkoya as Beeran Koya
 Sukumari as Sneha's grandmother (Madhavi)
 Thilakan
 Devan
 Lakshmi Sharma
 Anoop Chandran as Auto Driver Sunny
 Subi Suresh as Rosakutty
 Sadhika
 
 Thesni Khan as Suhara
 Thalaivasal Vijay as Advocate Surendra Menon
 Naveen R Mohan as Anparashan

References

2010s Malayalam-language films
Films scored by Mohan Sithara